Kohuora, located in the suburb of Papatoetoe, is one of the volcanoes in the Auckland volcanic field in the North Island of New Zealand. It has an explosion crater around 600 m wide, 30 m deep and with an irregular V-shape indicating it was formed by at least three explosion crater vents. The crater is surrounded on most sides by a 30 m high tuff ring/cone. The volcano, alongside Māngere Lagoon, Waitomokia, Crater Hill, Pukaki Lagoon and Robertson Hill, is one of the volcanic features collectively referred to as Nga Tapuwae a Mataoho ("The Sacred Footprints of Mataoho"), referring to the deity in Tāmaki Māori myths who was involved in their creation.

References

Bibliography 
City of Volcanoes: A geology of Auckland - Searle, Ernest J.; revised by Mayhill, R.D.; Longman Paul, 1981. First published 1964. .
"Volcanoes of Auckland: The essential guide." - Bruce Hayward, Graeme Murdoch, Gordon Maitland; Auckland University Press, 2011.
Volcanoes of Auckland: A Field Guide. Hayward, B.W.; Auckland University Press, 2019, 335 pp. .

External links
Kohuora Park.
Photograph of Kohuora held in Auckland Libraries' heritage collections.

Auckland volcanic field
Ōtara-Papatoetoe Local Board Area